Harvest Moon DS, known in Japan as , is a farm simulation role-playing video game for the Nintendo DS, part of the Story of Seasons series. It was published and developed by Marvelous Interactive Inc., and released in Japan on March 17, 2005, and in North America on September 12, 2006. It is the first entry in the series without series creator Yasuhiro Wada heavily involved, though it borrows many assets from Harvest Moon: Friends of Mineral Town and Harvest Moon: A Wonderful Life, such as the graphical style from the former and setting of the latter.

Plot
The player is a young man who lives with his friend Takakura on a farm in Forget-Me-Not-Valley, at roughly the same time as Harvest Moon: Friends of Mineral Town. The game begins with the Harvest Goddess, a deity of Harvest Moon, and the Witch Princess fighting. Neither can win, so they part ways. The Witch Princess, on meeting the Harvest Goddess next, attempts to cast a spell to silence her, but instead petrifies her. While trying to undo her spell, the Witch Princess inadvertently sends the Harvest Goddess to another world, so she sends all of the Harvest Sprites (small, elf-like creatures) to the same world to rescue her. The Witch Princess then tells the player to bring all of the Harvest Sprites back in order to rescue the Harvest Goddess.

Living in the valley are a number of villagers, nine bachelorettes, and five rival bachelors. The characters and locations in Harvest Moon DS are the same as those in Harvest Moon: A Wonderful Life with a few minor exceptions.

Gameplay
Players earn money primarily through their farm, by growing crops or raising livestock. Growing crops is slightly different from previous Harvest Moon games; rather than being restricted to his own farm land, the player may grow crops on unowned fields of various sizes and fertility all over the valley. Each crop must be planted during a certain season; for example, turnips must be planted in the spring. Players begin the game with only a dog and a cat on their farm. While the cat does little, the dog may be trained to fetch balls and chase away wild dogs from the farm. Cows, sheep, ducks, and chickens are available for purchase, and must be housed in different types of pens, which must be bought from Gotz, the town's woodcutter. Cows and sheep require an animal shed to live in before they may be purchased, and ducks and chickens require a bird shed. After the player ships 1000 items, Takakura will bring him a horse to keep. This horse does not need to be fed, and cannot get sick. However, it can be brushed to increase its affection towards the player.

After earning enough money, the player may upgrade their house by calling Gotz, and buy a kitchen, appliances, or furniture items by using the Harvest Sprite Shopping Network. If players upgrade their home twice, buy certain items, and rescue 60 Harvest Sprites, they may choose to marry. If the wife's affection is kept high for a season after marriage, she will become pregnant and give birth two seasons later. The game skips forward by three years after the birth, resulting in changes in the villager's lives but no change to the player's farm.

Extra content, as well as characters from Harvest Moon: Friends of Mineral Town, can be unlocked by inserting a copy of Harvest Moon: Friends of Mineral Town or More Friends of Mineral Town into the slot 2 of an original DS or DS Lite. However, marrying any of the bachelorettes from Mineral Town results in the game ending immediately; placing you back at your last save after the wedding.

There are a total of 101 Harvest Sprites to be rescued. They belong to different teams based on what skills they have (such as fishing or watering crops), and are divided into two sets. The first set of Harvest Sprite teams, after rescue, can be hired to help the player. The second set of teams cannot be hired, and fulfill specific purposes, such as running the casino or television stations. Rescuing the Harvest Sprites requires various farm related activities; activities related to a Harvest Sprite's skill will generally result in its rescue.

Release
Japanese versions of Harvest Moon DS can only connect to their Japanese counterparts, and while this feature is not available on PAL Harvest Moon DS cartridges, NTSC Harvest Moon DS cartridges can connect with PAL and NTSC Harvest Moon: Friends of Mineral Town cartridges.

Instead of offering poker and blackjack in the Harvest Sprite Casino, in PAL games all three sprites offer memory matching.

Reception

The game received "average" reviews according to the review aggregation website Metacritic. In Japan, Famitsu gave it a score of one seven, one nine, and two sevens for a total of 30 out of 40.

Harvest Moon DS Cute
It was published and developed by Marvelous Interactive Inc., and first released in Japan on December 8, 2005. Harvest Moon DS Cute replaces the male protagonist from Harvest Moon DS with a female character; players may choose either Pony from Harvest Moon: Another Wonderful Life or Claire from Harvest Moon: More Friends of Mineral Town. Basic gameplay remains unaltered between the two versions.

The plot of Harvest Moon DS Cute is different from that of Harvest Moon DS. In this version of the game, the player's mother sends a wish to the Harvest Goddess that you may be a successful farmer. The Harvest Goddess eventually determines the player has no work ethic, and tells the Harvest King what she thinks. The Harvest King angrily tells the Harvest Goddess she isn't trying hard enough, and she is slacking off in her old age. The Harvest Goddess then calls the Harvest King a "big baldy", and is turned into stone. The Harvest Sprites defend the Harvest Goddess, which angers the Harvest King even more, and he sends the Harvest Sprites and the Harvest Goddess to another world as punishment. He then writes a letter to the player telling her if she works hard, he will return the Harvest Sprites and the Harvest Goddess.

The Japanese version introduced a system not present in the North American version known as the "Best Friend" system. This allowed the player to marry only the four "special" bachelorettes from Harvest Moon DS, as well as any of the bachelors.

Reception

Harvest Moon DS Cute received "average" reviews according to Metacritic.

References

External links
 
 

2005 video games
DS
Marvelous Entertainment
Nintendo DS games
Nintendo DS-only games
Video games developed in Japan
Video games with alternative versions
Rising Star Games games
Natsume (company) games
Single-player video games